Buddhivantha ( Genius) is a 2008 Indian Kannada-language film directed by Ramnath Rigvedhi. starring Upendra in the lead role, while Pooja Gandhi, Brinda Parekh, Saloni Aswani, Natanya Singh, and Suman Ranganathan play the female leads. The film is a remake of the 2007 Tamil film Naan Avanillai, which was itself was a remake of 1974 Tamil movie Naan Avanillai which in turn was based on the 1962 Marathi play To Mee Navhech ( I Am Not Him) written by Pralhad K. Atre. The music was composed by Vijay Antony.

The film was released on 26 September 2008. It was supposed to be released on Upendra's birthday, 18 September 2008, but because of the delay in censor certification, the date was postponed to 26 September 2008. It became the highest grossing Kannada film of 2008 and turned out to be a much bigger hit than the original Naan Avanillai. It went on to complete over a 100-day theatrical run in the main centers of Karnataka.

Plot
The story begins with Panchamrutha (Upendra) standing in the court facing charges of cheating four beautiful women and the public prosecutor (Siddaraj Kalyankar) heaping more and more charges against him. Panchamrutha, who speaks in typical Mangalorean Kannada, denies having any links with these beautiful women and also argues his case to prove that he is innocent. Much to the dismay of the girls, police department, and PP, the judgement goes in favor of Panchamrutha and the judge (Lakshmi), who is the mother of Pooja (Pooja Gandhi), and sets him free.

Panchamrutha again ends up in the court due to cheating the beautiful daughter of the judge herself. The lawmakers are bent upon getting him convicted and they rope in his brother, but then, the smart man that he is, Panchamrutha gives his logic and again he emerges successful. The girls – Pooja, Rekha (Brinda Parekh), Shanthi (Saloni Aswani), Rani (Natanya Singh), and Monika (Suman Ranganathan) – are helpless, but then the time for truth comes. Apparently, Panchamrutha is the man who donned the roles of Zakir Hussain, Samarasimha Reddy, Ashok Mittal, Shyamprasad, and Rajneesh. All this he does with only one mission – to teach these arrogant and haughty women a lesson and cut them down to size. There is a very strong flashback connected to it that leads to the death of his sister-in-law, and that is when the peace-loving Panchamrutha became a skilled conman for greedy women. His flashback leads him to cheat girls, but he would not cheat any. Instead, he would be taught the reality of four girls except Pooja.

Zakir Hussain (Upendra) gets together with Pooja, and the pair walks away happily, leaving the audience to assume that they live happily ever after.

Cast

Upendra as Panchamrutha/Joseph Fernandes/Zakir Hussain/Vijay Mittal/Samarasimha Reddy/Sri Sri Sri Bhagavan Ranjaneesh Swamy/Shyam Prasad
Pooja Gandhi as Pooja, a law student
Brinda Parekh as Rekha Mithal
Saloni Aswani as Shanthi (Bangaaru)
Natanya Singh as Rani (Radhe)
Suman Ranganathan as Monika, an industrialist
Lakshmi as Pooja's mother, a judge
Hema Choudhary as Chandrabai, Rani's mother
Sridhar as David Fernandes, brother of Joseph Fernandes
Dharma as Rekha's brother
Chidanand as Johnny Walker
Ambareesh Sarangi 
 Roopesh Jain 
 B. Jayamma
 Rekha kumar 
 Jayaprakash reddy 
 Sri Gowri 
 Shankar Gowda 
 G. K. Govinda Rao 
Bank Janardhan as Police Constable
Raj Kapoor as Investigation Officer
Siddaraj Kalyankar as Public Prosecutor

Critical response
Now running.com gave the film a 3 out of 5 and wrote, "Upendra sparkles as an actor. Pooja Gandhi's performance is good, but it is Suman Ranganathan who makes a big impact. Veteran actors Lakshmi, Dharma, Sridhar, and Hema Chowdhary are all impressive in their respective roles."

Box office

Karnataka
The film was the highest grossing Kannada film of 2008, by collecting more than  150 million at the box office. It completed 100 days screening in more than 25 centres all over Karnataka.

Andhra Pradesh
The Telugu version of the film was released as Budhimanthudu in Andhra Pradesh. It completed 50 days of run and did decent business at the box office across Andhra Pradesh.

Soundtrack
The soundtrack of Buddhivantha received an amazing response upon its audio release and turned out to be one of the best selling albums of the year. The official soundtrack contains seven songs composed by Vijay Antony with the lyrics primarily penned by Kaviraj and Upendra. The audio of the film was released on 18 June 2008, three months before the release of the film. The album was released by Times Music. Except "Chitranna" which was reused from Vijay Antony's own composition "Dailomo" from Dishyum, he retained other tunes from the original Tamil film

Sequel
Buddhivantha 2 was announced in 2019.

References

External links
Official site

2000s Kannada-language films
2008 films
Films set in Bangalore
Kannada remakes of Tamil films
Films scored by Vijay Antony